The yelatáj chos woley, yelataj chas woley or simply jelataj choz, is a musical bow characteristic of the Wichi culture in the South American Gran Chaco.

Features 

The Yelatáj chos woley consists of two bows of tusca wood. The performer holds the end of one of the bows between his teeth and rubs that bowstring with the other. The musician's mouth acts as a resonator. Originally the bowstrings were made from peccary hair, vegetable fibers or other hair.  When horses arrived with the Spaniards to America, instrument makers began to use the hairs from horse manes and tails.

The dimensions of one listed at Musical Instrument Museums Online (MIMO) is 350 mmm long x 60 mm wide (bowstring to bow handle).

Usage
The yelatáj chos woley is for ceremonial and shamanic use.  He is attributed the power to invoke Nilataj, God of the Wichi ethnic group.

References

Musical bows
Argentine musical instruments